William Hamling (10 August 1912 – 20 March 1975) was a British Labour Party politician.

Hamling was educated at Liverpool University and was a signals officer in the Royal Marines during World War II.

Hamling contested Southport in 1945, Liverpool Wavertree in 1950 and 1951, Woolwich West in 1955 and 1959, and Torquay at the 1955 by-election, before he was finally elected as member of parliament (MP) for the Woolwich West constituency at the 1964 general election, and held the seat until his death in 1975, aged 62. The resulting Woolwich West by-election was won by the Conservative candidate Peter Bottomley.

Probably the author of A Short History of the Liverpool Trades Council, Liverpool Trades Council and Labour Party, 1948.

A stained-glass window depicting William Blake, dedicated to the memory of Hamling, may be found in St. Mary's Church, Battersea.

References
Times Guide to the House of Commons, 1951 & 1966

External links 
 
 Catalogue of Hamling's papers, held at the Modern Records Centre, University of Warwick
 St Mary's Battersea (memorial window)
 Mr William Hamling: Former MP for Greenwich Woolwich West

1912 births
1975 deaths
Royal Marines officers
Royal Marines personnel of World War II
Labour Party (UK) MPs for English constituencies
UK MPs 1964–1966
UK MPs 1966–1970
UK MPs 1970–1974
UK MPs 1974
UK MPs 1974–1979
Parliamentary Private Secretaries to the Prime Minister